Cornelis "Cees" Kurpershoek (born 30 June 1943 in Amersfoort) is a sailor from the Netherlands, who represented his native country at the 1972 Summer Olympics in Kiel, Germany. With helmsman Ben Staartjes Kurpershoek took the 5th place in the Tempest.

Sources
 
 
 
 
 
 
 

Living people
1943 births
Dutch male sailors (sport)

Sailors at the 1972 Summer Olympics – Tempest
Olympic sailors of the Netherlands
Sportspeople from Amersfoort
20th-century Dutch people
21st-century Dutch people